Bill, Billy, Willie, or William Paul may refer to:

Politics
 William Paul (MP), British MP for Windsor, 1710–1711
 William Paul (attorney) (1885–1977), Alaskan politician and attorney
 William Paul (Australian politician) (1846–1947), New South Wales politician
 William Paul (British politician) (1884–1958), also known as Bill, socialist politician
 William Paul (New Zealand politician) (1875–1942), New Zealand politician
 William James Paul (1854–1929), Canadian politician
 William Sheffield Paul (1832–1902), Member of the Queensland Legislative Assembly, Australia

Sports
 William Paul (footballer, born 1868) (1868–1932), Scottish footballer
 Willie Paul (footballer) (1866–1911), Scottish footballer
 Bill Paul (cyclist) (1910–2003), cyclist and tandem rider
 William Wayne Paul (1939–1989), American martial artist
 Willie Paul (bowls) (born 1944), Scottish international lawn bowler
 William Paul (judoka), American who participated in Judo at the 1967 Pan American Games

Other
 William Paul (bishop) (1599–1665), Bishop of Oxford and Dean of Lichfield
 William Paul (minister) (1754–1802), a minister of the Church of Scotland, Chaplain in Ordinary in Scotland to King George III of the United Kingdom
 William Paul (Utah architect) (1803–1889)
 William Paul (horticulturalist) (1822–1905), British
 William H. Paul (1844–1911), United States soldier
 Billy Paul (1934–2016), American soul singer
 William E. Paul (1936–2015), American immunologist
 William Paul (died 1773), older brother of John Paul Jones
 Billy Paul (fl. 1970s), saxophonist with Wizzo Band

See also
 William Paule (fl. 1388), English politician